Masaharu Nakagawa may refer to:
Masaharu Nakagawa (House of Representatives), member of the Japanese House of Representatives and Minister of Education, Culture, Sports, Science and Technology in the cabinet of prime minister Yoshihiko Noda
Masaharu Nakagawa (House of Councillors), member of the Japanese House of Councillors

See also
 Nakagawa (surname)